Takuya is a masculine Japanese given name. Notable people with the name include:

Takuya Asanuma (born 1971), Japanese guitarist and former member of Judy and Mary who performs as "TAKUYA"
Takuya Eguchi, Japanese voice actor
, Japanese long-distance runner
, Japanese slalom canoeist
, Japanese footballer
Takuya Hirai (born 1958), Japanese politician, member of the Japanese House of Representatives
Takuya Igarashi, Japanese anime director
, Japanese alpine skier
, Japanese footballer
Takuya Jinno (born 1970), Japanese footballer
, Japanese professional baseball player
, Japanese footballe
Takuya Kimura (born 1972), member of the Japanese pop vocal group, SMAP
Takuya Kimura (baseball) (1972–2010), baseball player
Takuya Kirimoto, Japanese voice actor
Takuya Kondo (born 1991), Japanese figure skater
Takuya Kurosawa (born 1962), Japanese race car driver
, Japanese footballer
, Japanese footballer
, Japanese footballer
Takuya Nagase, Japanese shogi player
, Japanese shogi player
, Japanese footballer
, Japanese footballer
Takuya Onishi (born 1975), Japanese astronaut candidate from JAXA
, Japanese sport wrestler
, Japanese anime screenwriter and director
, Japanese footballer
, Japanese voice actor
, Japanese footballer
, Japanese footballer
Takuya Sugi (born 1983), Japanese professional wrestler
, Japanese footballer
Takuya Takagi (born 1967), Japanese professional footballer and coach
Takuya Tasso (born 1964), Japanese politician, governor of Iwate Prefecture
Takuya Terada (born 1992), Japanese singer, actor and model, currently active in Korean band Cross Gene
Takuya Tsukahara (born 1937), Japanese photographer
, Japanese footballer
Takuya Yamada (born 1974), Japanese footballer
, Japanese footballer
, Japanese footballer
, Japanese footballer
Takuya∞, the vocalist for the Japanese band Uverworld
, Japanese sumo wrestler
, Japanese sumo wrestler

Fictional characters
Takuya Enoki, the main character in the manga series Aka-chan to Boku
Takuya Morooka, a character in the visual novel Maji de Watashi ni Koi Shinasai!
Takuya Kanbara, a character in the anime series Digimon Frontier
Takuya Yamashiro, protagonist of the tokusatsu television series Spider-Man
, a character from the Assassination Classroom manga and anime series
Takuya Kai, the Main character in the metal heroes series Juukou B-Fighter

See also
94884 Takuya, a main-belt asteroid

Japanese masculine given names